Tennis at the 2017 Southeast Asian Games was held in the National Tennis Centre, Jalan Duta from 21 to 26 August 2017.

Participating nations
A total of 71 athletes from nine nations competed in tennis at the 2017 Southeast Asian Games:

Competition schedule
Tennis events at the 2017 Southeast Asian Games were held from 21 to 26 August 2017.

Medalists

Medal table

See also
Wheelchair tennis at the 2017 ASEAN Para Games

References

External links